The Montreal Orioles are a junior baseball team that play in the Ligue de Baseball Junior Élite du Québec. The Orioles play their home games at Gary Carter Stadium (formerly Marcel-Clement Field) at Ahuntsic Park in the borough of Ahuntsic-Cartierville in Montreal, Quebec, Canada. It was established in 1999, as the Élites de Montréal, following a merger of two former teams, the Athlétiques de Rosemont and the Orioles d'Ahuntsic.

Former players

The following is a list of notable players, who have played for Orioles in the past:
Emmanuel Garcia, Buffalo Bisons
Max St. Pierre, Toledo Mud Hens
Mathieu Leblanc Poirier, Quebec Capitales
Josué Peley, Salem Red Sox

References

External links
Official site

Baseball teams in Montreal
1999 establishments in Quebec